Popoudina is a genus of moths in the family Erebidae from the Afrotropics. The genus was erected by Vladimir Viktorovitch Dubatolov in 2006. Formerly, species of this genus were mistakenly included in Estigmene. Probably, some species of the latter genus might belong to Popoudina.

Species
 Popoudina aliena (Kiriakoff, 1954)
 Popoudina dorsalis (Walker, 1855)
 Popoudina griseipennis (Bartel, 1903)
 Popoudina leighi (Rothschild, 1910)
 Popoudina lemniscata (Distant, 1898)
 Popoudina linea (Walker, 1855)
 Popoudina kovtunovitchi Dubatolov, 2011
 Popoudina pamphilia (Kiriakoff, 1958)

Subgenus Pseudopopoudina Dubatolov, 2006 
 Popoudina brosi (Toulgoët, 1986)

References 
 , 2006: New genera and species of Arctiinae from the Afrotropical fauna (Lepidoptera: Arctiidae). Nachrichten des Entomologische Vereins Apollo 27 (3): 139-152.
 , 2011: Arctiinae from African expeditions of V. Kovtunovich & P. Ustjuzhanin in 2009-2011, with description of new taxa and taxonomic notes (Lepidoptera, Arctiidae). Atalanta 42 (1/2): 125-135.

Spilosomina
Moth genera